Diana Yekinni is a British Nigerian actress. In 2014, she was nominated in the "Most Promising Actress" category at the 2014 edition of the Golden Icons Academy Movie Awards.

Early life and education
Diana Yekinni was born and raised in South London, England. She is an alumnus of the American Academy of Dramatic Arts, Los Angeles she had previously studied theatre and dance at the BRIT School for Performing Arts and Technology.

Career
She started her professional acting career in 2009 after she featured in an American television series titled Medium. In 2010, she was cast as Libby in the film Ijé and Odele in Mosa. In 2012, Yekinni participated and won the maiden edition of the Annual GIAMA Screen Icon Search Competition in Houston, U.S. She moved to Nigeria in 2012 and has since featured in several television series and films including A New You, All That Glitters, Saro: The Musical, Jenifa's Diary as Genevieve, Lagos Cougars and Lunch Time Heroes.

Filmography

Awards and recognitions

References

External links

Living people
21st-century Nigerian actresses
Yoruba actresses
Nigerian expatriates in the United Kingdom
21st-century British actresses
Black British actresses
Year of birth missing (living people)
American Academy of Dramatic Arts alumni
British emigrants to Nigeria
Actresses from Lagos State